Eric Litwin (born August 16, 1966), also known as Mr. Eric, is an American storyteller and musician best known as the original author of the Pete the Cat books.

Life
Litwin was born in New York City.
He graduated from George Washington University, and the University at Albany. 
He moved to Atlanta, Georgia, in 1993.

Works

Pete the Cat and His Four Groovy Buttons, HarperCollins Publishers Limited, 2014, ISBN 9780007553679

References

External links

 
 Interview (no date) at Sprockster.com
 

1966 births
Living people